Artur Slabashevich (born 9 February 1989) is a Belarusian professional footballer who plays for Belshina Bobruisk.

References

External links
 
 
 Profile at teams.by

1989 births
Living people
Belarusian footballers
Association football defenders
Belarusian expatriate footballers
Expatriate footballers in the Czech Republic
FC Energetik-BGU Minsk players
FK Baník Most players
FC Rechitsa-2014 players
FC Smolevichi players
FC Isloch Minsk Raion players
FC Slavia Mozyr players
FC Vitebsk players
FC Neman Grodno players
FC Dynamo Brest players
FC Belshina Bobruisk players